Vice Admiral Sir Henry Mangles Denham (28 August 1800 – 3 July 1887) was a Royal Navy officer who went on to be Commander-in-Chief, Pacific Station.

Early career
Denham entered the navy in 1809. He became midshipman while serving on Vulture. He continued to work on the Channel Islands survey until 1817, again under White. In 1817, White took command of the survey vessel  and Denhham worked under him on surveys in the English Channel and Ireland. He was promoted to lieutenant in 1822. From September 1828 to March 1835, he surveyed the Bristol Channel, and the ports of Liverpool and Milford.

In the early 1830s the expansion of the Port of Liverpool was being severely restricted by the silting of the channels leading to the port. The Dock Trustees asked the Admiralty for help, and in 1833 Denham was assigned to survey the area. He carried out the most thorough survey of the Mersey and its approaches to date, and analysed the volumes and patterns of flow and the quantities of solid material transported by each tide. He argued that if existing channels were becoming blocked the tidal flow must be going somewhere else. He was able to identify and chart a new channel, and mark it with buoys. This greatly increased the volume of shipping the port could handle. He was awarded the Freedom of the Borough of Liverpool in 1834, and in 1835 became Resident Marine Surveyor to the port. In 1837, when shoaling became problematic on the outer part of the channel, he introduced a system for dredging with a steamer towing a set of spiked cables spaced along an oak beam. This continued in use until 1890. On 28 February 1839 he became a Fellow of the Royal Society. According to Mountfield (1953) "it was Denham's work during the 'thirties and 'forties which made Liverpool the great terminal port which the rapidly swelling trade of industrial England so urgently required."

Denham's time at Liverpool ended in discord, with Denham frustrated at the lack of resources available. This came to a head in the great storm of 1839 when lightships as well as buoys were torn from there moorings, and Denham saw himself as prevented from hiring boats and crews to remedy the situation. Another source of tension was that at least some members of the committee felt that Denham was exceeding his brief by advocating changes in the way the port approaches were managed, proposing a body with authority over the entire river estuary, not just of the port. His appointment was terminated in 1839. He remained in the NW of England for several years, being appointed by the Admiralty to survey the coasts of Lancashire and Cumberland. He published many of the results of his work in a set of Sailing direction for the area, published in 1840.

From 1848 to 1851 he was employed in conducting inquiries into accidents at sea.

Survey of the South Pacific, 1852-1861
As captain of HMS Herald, he carried out major survey work around Australia, New Caledonia and other parts of the Southwest Pacific in the period 1852 to 1861.

The voyage of HMS Herald earned him a lasting place in the history of maritime surveying. For a decade, the Herald surveyed and charted known land masses and suspected hazards in the south-west Pacific and substantial parts of the Australian coast, thereby establishing safe routes for shipping. Some of the Herald's charts are still in use. At the time of Denham's voyages, the south-west Pacific was a mission field, a site of commercial activity, and a colonial outpost. The natural history specimens gathered by naturalists William Grant Milne and John MacGillivray on the expedition resulted in significant additions to botanical and ornithological collections.

The voyage began in England on 21 February 1852, arriving in Australia on 18 February 1853. The ship then began its main survey by visiting Lord Howe Island, the Isle of Pines (New Caledonia) and Aneityum (Vanuatu) (19 February 1853 to 1 January 1854); New Zealand and Raoul Island, (2 January 1854 to 2 September 1854); Fiji, (3 September 1854 to 24 November 1854); and Norfolk Island (June 1855). After a second visit to Fiji, (25 June 1855 to 3 February 1856), the Herald was involved with the resettlement of the Pitcairn Islanders to Norfolk Island, (4 February 1856 to 26 June 1856). A third visit was then undertaken to Fiji, (27 June 1856 to 26 February 1857), followed by the survey of Port Jackson, New South Wales, (27 February 1857 to 20 December 1857); Bass Strait, King George Sound and Shark Bay (21 December 1857 to 29 June 1858). After three visits to the Coral Sea, (30 June 1858 to 23 May 1860), the Herald began the first leg of its homeward voyage, Sydney to Surabaya, (24 May 1860 to 20 November 1860), departing Surabaya on 21 November 1860 and arriving at Chatham on 1 June 1861.

Commander-in-chief, Pacific

From 10 May 1864 to 21 November 1866, Denham served as Commander-in-Chief, Pacific Station. In 1866, he was knighted for his hydrographical services. He retired with the rank of vice admiral in 1871.

The town of Denham, Western Australia, named is after him, as is the New Caledonian endemic tree Meryta denhamii.  Denham Island, British Columbia, was named after him by a fellow Royal Navy surveyor.

Family
In 1826, he married Isabella (died 1865), daughter of Rev. Joseph Cole, of Carmarthen. He was buried near the beach at the head of Denham Bay.

See also
 
 John MacGillivray
 William Grant Milne
 European and American voyages of scientific exploration

Notes

References
 David, A. (1995). The voyage of HMS Herald to Australia and the South-west Pacific 1852-1861 under the command of Captain Henry Mangles Denham. Miegunyah Press Series. Carlton, Victoria: Melbourne University Press.
 Oliver, R., 'The Vegetation of the Kermadec Islands'. Transactions and Proceedings of the Royal Society of New Zealand, Volume 42, 1909, p. 121. URL: RSNZ, Retrieved 3 January 2007.

External links

 Australian National Botanic Gardens, Biography
 Biography of Henry Mangles Denham, RN
 Mid-Victorian RN vessel HMS Termagant (Herald)
 

Royal Navy vice admirals
Explorers of Australia
English cartographers
Fellows of the Royal Society
1800 births
1887 deaths
Shark Bay
Companions of the Order of St Michael and St George
Raoul Island